Miss Grand Colombia 2018 was the first edition of the Miss Grand Colombia beauty pageant, held on February 11, 2018, at the BH Tempo Hotel in Villeta, Cundinamarca. At the end of the event, Génesis Quintero of Orinoquía was named the winner, outclassing the other four contestants, and was expected to represent Colombia at the Miss Grand International 2018 pageant in Myanmar. 

The organizer, however, forced Quintero to resign due to health issues following breast augmentation; she was not physically fit to participate, as claimed by the director, as well as a financial conflict between them. The organizer then also relinquished the competition license to the Miss Colombia organization (CNB Colombia),which later nominated Sheyla Quizena, a 21-year-old international business student, as the new country representative for the aforementioned international contest, but Sheyla did not get any placements in such an event.

Following her victory, Génesis was criticized for her physical appearance by certain Colombian netizens, with some even wishing for her death, according to her, caused her to release an open letter to retaliate. After her resignation in late 2018, she was instead assigned to participate in the Miss Grand International 2019 contest in Venezuela, as the replacement for the former representative, Sthefany Rodríguez, who resigned the title two months after the appointment, by that year's licensee, Luis Humberto Garcés, and she was placed among the top 20 finalists.

Results

Candidates
Five contestants competed for the title of Miss Grand Colombia 2018.

References

External links

 

Miss Grand Colombia
Grand Colombia